Herbert Spencer Gamble (2 March 1903 – 15 June 1962) was an Australian cricketer. He played seven first-class cricket matches for Victoria between 1923 and 1929 and thirteen for Queensland between 1931 and 1934. He played for Hawthorn-East Melbourne in Victorian district cricket and Eastern Suburbs in Queensland district cricket.

See also
 List of Victoria first-class cricketers
 List of Queensland first-class cricketers

References

External links
 

1903 births
1962 deaths
Australian cricketers
Queensland cricketers
Victoria cricketers
Cricketers from Melbourne
People from Sunbury, Victoria